Tunay Açar (born 30 April 1989) is a Turkish footballer who plays as a full-back for SV Zeilsheim.

References

External links
 
 
 
 Tunay Açar at FuPa

1989 births
Living people
Sportspeople from Wiesbaden
Turkish footballers
Turkey youth international footballers
Turkey under-21 international footballers
German footballers
German people of Turkish descent
Association football defenders
SV Wehen Wiesbaden players
Eskişehirspor footballers
SV Darmstadt 98 players
Bursaspor footballers
Adana Demirspor footballers
Turgutluspor footballers
Fethiyespor footballers
Pendikspor footballers
FV Biebrich players
3. Liga players
Regionalliga players
TFF First League players
TFF Second League players
Footballers from Hesse